"Candidatus Bartonella merieuxii" is a candidatus bacteria from the genus of Bartonella Candidatus Bartonella merieuxii is named after Charles Mérieux.

References

Bartonellaceae
Bacteria described in 2012
Candidatus taxa